Variabiloconus is an extinct genus of conodonts.

Variabiloconus bassleri (Furnish) is from the upper part of middle Gasconade Dolomites at Phillips Quarry, United States.

Variabiloconus crassus Zeballo and Albanesi, 2013 is from the Late Cambrian (late Furongian) or early Ordovician (Tremadocian) of the Santa Rosita Formation in the Tilcara Range, Cordillera Oriental of Jujuy in Argentina.

References

External links 

 
 

Conodont genera
Cambrian conodonts
Ordovician conodonts
Furongian first appearances
Early Ordovician extinctions
Tremadocian
Ordovician Argentina
Fossils of Argentina
Fossil taxa described in 1986